Thomas Blake Kennedy (April 4, 1874 – May 21, 1957) was a United States district judge of the United States District Court for the District of Wyoming.

Education and career

Born in Commerce, Michigan, Kennedy received an Artium Baccalaureus degree from Franklin College (now Muskingum University) in New Athens, Ohio in 1895, a Bachelor of Laws from Syracuse University College of Law in 1897, and an Artium Magister degree from Franklin College in 1898. He was in private practice in Syracuse, New York from 1898 to 1901, and then in Cheyenne, Wyoming until 1921. He was a Referee in Bankruptcy for the United States District Court for the District of Wyoming from 1903 to 1913 and from 1919 to 1921.

Federal judicial service

On October 17, 1921, Kennedy was nominated by President Warren G. Harding to a seat on the United States District Court for the District of Wyoming vacated by Judge John Alden Riner. Kennedy was confirmed by the United States Senate on October 25, 1921, and received his commission the same day. He assumed senior status on November 6, 1955, serving in that capacity until his death on May 21, 1957, in Cheyenne.

References

Sources
 

1874 births
1957 deaths
Syracuse University College of Law alumni
Judges of the United States District Court for the District of Wyoming
United States district court judges appointed by Warren G. Harding
20th-century American judges
People from Commerce, Michigan
People from Cheyenne, Wyoming